Portugal competed at the 2013 World Championships in Athletics in Moscow, Russia, from 10–18 August 2013.
A team of 12 athlete was announced to represent the country in the event.

Results

(q – qualified, NM – no mark, SB – season best)

Men

Women

See also
 Portugal at the 2013 World Aquatics Championships

References

External links
IAAF World Championships 2013 – Portugal

Nations at the 2013 World Championships in Athletics
2013
World Championships in Athletics